Up Periscope is a 1959 World War II submarine film drama directed by Gordon Douglas, produced by Aubrey Schenck and starring James Garner and Edmond O'Brien. The supporting cast features Andra Martin, Alan Hale Jr., Edd Byrnes, Warren Oates and Saundra Edwards. The film was shot and processed in WarnerScope and Technicolor and was  distributed by Warner Bros. The screenplay was written by Richard H. Landau and Robb White, adapted from White's novel of the same name.

Garner called the film "another piece of crap that Warner Bros. stuck me in while I was under contract."

Plot
Lt. Kenneth Braden, a newly trained U.S. Navy frogman, is unexpectedly ordered to report for duty without being able to notify his new girlfriend Sally Johnson. He learns that she is a naval intelligence officer responsible for a recent confirmation of his character and fitness for a special mission.

Submarine commander Stevenson, whose crew's morale has been shaken by the recent unnecessary death of a crew member, is ordered to take Braden to the island of Kusaie (Kosrae) to photograph a code book at a Japanese radio station. Stevenson waits in Lelu Harbor while Braden executes his covert mission.

After Braden returns, Stevenson dictates a letter accusing himself of endangering his submarine and crew in order to make Braden's mission easier. When they reach Pearl Harbor, Braden informs Stevenson that his crew "lost" the letter. To Braden's surprise and delight, Sally is waiting at the dock to greet him.

Cast

 James Garner as Lt. (j.g.) Kenneth M. Braden
 Edmond O'Brien as Commander Paul Stevenson
 Andra Martin as Sally Johnson
 Alan Hale Jr. as Ensign/Lt. (j.g.) Pat Malone (billed as Alan Hale)	
 Carleton Carpenter as Lt. Phil Carney
 William Leslie as Lt. Doherty
 Frank Gifford as Ensign Cy Mount
 Henry Kulky as Chief Petty Officer York
 Edd Byrnes as Pharmacist Mate Ash (billed as Edward Byrnes)
 Richard Bakalyan as Seaman Peck
 Sean Garrison as Seaman Floyd
 Warren Oates as Seaman Kovacs
 Saundra Edwards as a bar girl (uncredited)

Reception 
In a contemporary review for The New York Times, critic A. H. Weiler wrote: "[I]t seems to run a familiar and somewhat undramatic course. ... Although there are moments of tension in 'Up Periscope,' it sails a movie course that is not particularly exciting. The bravery shown here is no longer unsung."

See also
 List of American films of 1959

References

External links
 
 
 
 
 

1959 films
1950s war films
American war films
Films directed by Gordon Douglas
Films scored by Ray Heindorf
Films set in Kiribati
Pacific War films
Films about the United States Navy in World War II
World War II submarine films
Films based on works by Robb White
Films based on American novels
1950s English-language films
1950s American films